Delta Hotels by Marriott is a four-star brand of hotels and resorts located primarily in North America.

Canadian institution

Beginnings
In June 1962, William Pattison and his business partners opened the 68-room Delport Inn in Richmond, BC. That September, Western Hotels changed the location name to the Vancouver Airport Inn,
and assumed the management until January 1964.
 
During 1965–1967, Delta Developments built four motels on Vancouver Island, and leased/purchased two further motels in the BC interior. Driver Developments, which bought Delta Developments in 1969, experienced serious financial difficulties from its diverse investment portfolio within months. In 1970, Delta Hotels Limited assumed the ownership and operation of the hotels/motels. 
By mid 1974, the chain had been pruned to four properties.

Beyond BC

In 1975, Delta entered the Toronto market. By 1980, the six BC properties matched the six out of province. By 1985, there were four in BC, four in Ontario, and five across four other provinces. The owners, Canadian Imperial Bank of Commerce, Great-West Lifeco, and Bill Pattison, sold the chain to the Realstar Group of Toronto in 1988. A decade later, Realstar, and partner Lai Sun Group, resold to Canadian Pacific Hotels (CP Hotels). During the 1990s, Delta operated a single US hotel, the Delta Court of Flags Hotel in Orlando, Florida. 

In 1999, after CP Hotels acquired the Fairmont brand, six CP properties rebranded to supplement the existing 24 Delta ones, and the Delta chain became a wholly owned subsidiary of CP Hotel's two-thirds-owned Fairmont Hotels and Resorts. In terms of classification, Fairmont was four star and Delta three star. After British Columbia Investment Management Corporation (BCI) acquired Delta in 2007, the brand flourished, and by 2013 the portfolio comprised 40 properties, of which 31 were managed (10 having the real estate owned), and nine were franchised.

Canadian portfolio
Since 2015, each venue prefix has become Delta Hotels by Marriott.

Marriott subsidiary

Accommodations

Operations
In 2015, Marriott International acquired the chain, making Marriott the largest full service hotel company in Canada. Augmenting the exclusively Canadian properties, two US ones were added in 2016. US properties now outnumber Canadian ones.

International expansion was first to Shanghai, then Frankfurt. Dubai, three for the United Kingdom, and Istanbul, followed. In August 2022, it was announced that 23 Marriott Hotels in the United Kingdom were to rebrand as Delta Hotels by Marriott. The rebrand is currently underway and is hoped that it will be completed in 2023, according to Business Traveller.

In 2016, Delta Privilege rewards extended to other Marriott locations, and Marriott cards extended to Delta locations. In 2019, Marriott Bonvoy replaced the various Marriott group rewards programs.

Rebranding of Marriott-branded Hotels in the United Kingdom 
In August 2022, a Business Traveller article was written stating that 23 existing Marriott Hotels, including Country Clubs, were to be rebranded as Delta Hotels by Marriott - this means that very few properties will remain under the Marriott name.

The hotels that are to be rebranded are as follows:

 Manchester Airport Marriott Hotel
 Durham Marriott Hotel Royal County
 Swindon Marriott Hotel
 Bexleyheath Marriott Hotel
 Heathrow/Windsor Marriott Hotel
 Northampton Marriott Hotel
 Newcastle Gateshead Marriott Hotel MetroCentre
 Birmingham Marriott Hotel
 Preston Marriott Hotel
 Edinburgh Marriott Hotel
 Liverpool Marriott City Centre
 Bristol Marriott Hotel City Centre
 Waltham Abbey Marriott Hotel
 Swansea Marriott Hotel
 Peterborough Marriott Hotel
 Huntingdon Marriott Hotel
 Aberdeen Marriott Hotel
 St. Pierre Marriott Hotel & Country Club
 Tudor Park Marriott Hotel & Country Club
 Forest of Arden Marriott Hotel & Country Club
 Breadsall Priory Marriott Hotel & Country Club
 Worsley Park Marriott Hotel & Country Club
 York Marriott Hotel

Some of the hotels have already rebranded, whilst others are in progress.

Footnotes

References

External links
 

Hotel chains in Canada
Canadian brands
Marriott International brands
Hotels established in 1962
1962 establishments in British Columbia
2015 mergers and acquisitions